Martaveous Davon McKnight (born April 5, 1997) is an American basketball player for Manchester Giants of the British Basketball League (BBL). He played college basketball for Arkansas–Pine Bluff.

Early career 
McKnight attended Lake Cormorant High School, where he averaged 24 points per game during his senior season. He enrolled at Itawamba Community College, where he averaged 12.5 points, 4.6 rebounds and 2.0 assists per game and was named one of the Top Incoming Freshmen by the National Junior College Athletic Association (NJCAA). McKnight averaged 8.1 points, 3.7 rebounds and 2.5 assists per game as a sophomore. In June 2017 it was announced that he had signed with Arkansas–Pine Bluff. As a junior he averaged 18.5 points per game, second highest in the SWAC, and 3.5 assists and 2.0 steals per game. At the conclusion of the regular season, he was named  SWAC Player of the Year. As a senior, McKnight averaged 20.8 points, 5 rebounds, 3 assists and 1.5 steals per game. He was named to the First Team All-SWAC.

Professional career 
Following his college career, McKnight signed with the Delaware Blue Coats of the NBA G League for training camp but did not make the final roster. He spent his rookie season with Sloboda Tuzla of the Basketball Championship of Bosnia and Herzegovina and the ABA League Second Division, averaging 10 points, three rebounds and three assists per game. On August 4, 2020, McKnight signed with BC Khimik of the Ukrainian Basketball SuperLeague. On August 6, 2021, he signed with the Manchester Giants of the British Basketball League.

References

External links
Arkansas–Pine Bluff Golden Lions bio

1995 births
Living people
African-American basketball players
American men's basketball players
Arkansas–Pine Bluff Golden Lions men's basketball players
Basketball players from Mississippi
Itawamba Community College alumni
Junior college men's basketball players in the United States
People from Walls, Mississippi
Shooting guards
OKK Sloboda Tuzla players
American expatriate basketball people in Bosnia and Herzegovina
21st-century African-American sportspeople
BC Khimik players
Manchester Giants players